Mohammad Yusuf Ansari is an Indian politician and a member of the 16th Legislative Assembly of Uttar Pradesh of India. He represents the Moradabad Nagar constituency of Uttar Pradesh and is a member of the Samajwadi Party.

Early life and education
Mohammad Yusuf Ansari was born in Moradabad district, Uttar Pradesh. He has not received any formal education but is literate. Before being elected as MLA, he used to work as a businessperson.

Political career
Mohammad Yusuf Ansari has been a MLA for one term. He represents the Moradabad Nagar constituency and is a member of the Samajwadi Party.

Posts held

See also
Moradabad Nagar
Politics of India
Sixteenth Legislative Assembly of Uttar Pradesh
Uttar Pradesh Legislative Assembly

References 

1958 births
Living people
People from Moradabad district
Samajwadi Party politicians
Uttar Pradesh MLAs 2012–2017